These are terms used in the Chinese martial art, Wing Chun.  They are originally colloquial Cantonese (or Foshan spoken slang). Thus, their meanings might be difficult to trace. Some of those terms are used in Jeet Kune Do, sometimes with a different meaning.

Forms

Family Lineage Titles or Terms

Limb names

18 hand technique names

Limb position names

Limb movement names

Drills

Other techniques:

1.Lin Wan Kuen - Chain Punch

2.One inch punch

3.Wing chun Double punch

4.Pai jarn - Horizontal
 "Hacking" Elbow strike

5.Kwan sau - Rotating Hand

6.Gaun Sau – Splitting Hand

7.Yee Jee Kim Yueng Ma – Horse Stance (In some Lineages this is translated as 'Small Aduction Goat stance (or Figure 2 Stance due to the gap at the knees being smaller than at the feet thereby looking like the character Two in chinese writing) Some Lineages don't turn the whole foot pigeon toed, instead only the front of the foot with the sides of the foot being parallel

8.Wing Chun Centerline Training

9.Iron Palm Training

See also
 Kung Fu (Ranking)

Notes

References

Wing Chun
Chinese martial arts terminology
Wing Chun
Wikipedia glossaries using tables